Albert "Clem" Alter (born ) is an American clown, noted for his work as a hospital clown. He is also a mime.

Alter was raised in Greeneville, Tennessee, and graduated from the University of Notre Dame in 1969. During the Vietnam War, he was a conscientious objector, and worked with the Catholic Relief Services in Vietnam 1971-1973. He worked as a chemical engineer until 1977, saying later that there was more to life than making money for a million-dollar corporation, and in 1981 he graduated from the Ringling Bros. and Barnum & Bailey Clown College. Since 1985, he has been teaching with Young Audiences of Oregon, an organization that promotes arts in education.

He toured with the Ringling Bros. and Barnum & Bailey Circus, took part in establishing a clown college in Tokyo, and has performed and taught internationally.   In 1994, Alter was the opening act together with Skeeter Reece (as "Alter and Reece") at a Britt Music Festival with the Smothers Brothers. Alter and Reece also worked as hospital clowns together, and Alter has performed at hospitals like the Doernbecher Children's Hospital, the Floating Hospital for Children and Randall Children's Hospital. In 1991, he said that

In the 90s, he was part of the BoZoArtZ musical group, and was the northwest regional vice president of Clowns of America International. As of 2016, he lives in Portland, Oregon.

References

External links
 Featured Artist: Albert Alter at Young Audiences
 Albert Alter - Mind to Mime to Word: How Stories Are Created, Told and Shared, 2017 Young Audiences video

Living people
American clowns
Ringling Bros. and Barnum & Bailey Circus people
People from Greeneville, Tennessee
University of Notre Dame alumni
American conscientious objectors
American mimes
Artists from Portland, Oregon
Year of birth missing (living people)